Mount Black is a prominent mountain of Antarctica,  high, with a gentle snow-covered slope on its southwest side and a steep rock face on its northwest side, forming a part of the polar escarpment just west of Bennett Platform and the upper reaches of Shackleton Glacier. It was discovered and photographed by R. Admiral Byrd on his return flight from the South Pole in November 1929, and named by him for Van Lear Black, American financier and contributor to the Byrd Antarctic Expedition of 1928–30 and 1933–35.

References
 

Mountains of the Ross Dependency
Dufek Coast